Adelpherupa typicota is a species of moth of the family Crambidae. It is found in the Democratic Republic of Congo (Orientale, Equateur, Kinshasa and Katanga) and Tanzania.

References

Moths described in 1933
Schoenobiinae
Moths of Africa